Sultan Haji Muhammad Imaaduddeen VI Iskandar was the sultan of the Maldives from 1893 to 1902. Sultan Imaaduddeen was born on 25 October 1868 to Prince Hassan Izzuddeen and Maandhoogey Dhon Didi. He was the younger half brother of Sultan Muhammad Mueenuddeen II [Kuda Bandaarain] and the grandson of Sultan Muhammad Imaduddeen IV of the Maldive islands. Despite being the eldest son of the latter, his father Prince Hassan Izzuddeen was removed from the line of succession on account of his blindness. 

Sultan Imaaduddeen VI ascended the throne on 20 July 1893. After his Hajj pilgrimage he became famous with the name as Haji Imaadudeen. He spoke fluent Urdu and Arabic. Sultan Imaaduddeen VI went to Egypt to marry his fiancé Sharifaa Hanim, and while he was there he was deposed from the throne.

He died on 30 September 1932 and was buried in Cairo, the capital of Egypt.

19th-century sultans of the Maldives
1868 births
1932 deaths
20th-century sultans of the Maldives